Devendra Sharma may refer to:

 Devendra Sharma (umpire) (born 1953), Indian cricket umpire
 Devendra Sharma (politician) (born 1959), Indian politician
 Devendra Sharma (serial killer), Indian serial killer and Ayurveda doctor